The 2002–03 Cymru Alliance was the thirteenth season of the Cymru Alliance after its establishment in 1990. The league was won by CPD Porthmadog.

League table

External links
Cymru Alliance

Cymru Alliance seasons
2
Wales